Pillar of Fire and Other Plays (1975) is a collection of three plays by Ray Bradbury: Pillar of Fire, Kaleidoscope, and The Foghorn. All are adaptations of his short stories of the same names. The genre of these works is science fiction.

See also
 "The Fog Horn", short story
 S is for Space, anthology which includes the short story "Pillar of Fire"

External links
 
 
 

1975 fiction books
1975 plays
Plays by Ray Bradbury
Books of plays